Adath Shalom was a synagogue located in the Whitman neighborhood of South Philadelphia at 607 W Ritner Street/2353-2355 S Marshall Street, the corner of Marshall and Ritner Streets. The synagogue opened in 1922 and closed in 2007. The building was most recently used as a Buddhist temple. It was sold in February 2018 and is vacant in 2019.

Adath Shalom formed in 1950 as a Conservative synagogue when Shaare Israel, B’nai Moshe, and Beth Samuel merged and formed in Beth Samuel's building. Adath Shalom closed in 2007, donated many of its religious articles to Congregation Tiferes B'nai Israel in Warrington, Pennsylvania, and sold its building to the Cambodian Khmer Buddhist Humanitarian Association.

Congregation

Beth Samuel Nusach Ashkenazi was incorporated in 1922 by Lithuanian Jews and was often referred to as Beys Shmuel, or the litvishe shul.

After merging with another congregation in 1961, it was renamed Adath Shalom and affiliated with the United Synagogue of Conservative Judaism.

Rabbi Aaron Decter led the congregation in the 1960s. He was chairman of human relations for the South Philadelphia Citizens Committee, and spoke out in favor of Philadelphia's school bussing program in 1965. Robert P. Tabak was rabbi from 1977 to 1979. The Jewish Exponent synagogue directory identified Mendel Litman as cantor and Samuel Cander as president in September 1995 when it was affiliated with the United Synagogue of Conservative Judaism. Gail Glickman served as Adath Shalom's last rabbi on a part-time basis.

The synagogue last held High Holiday services in 2004, and closed in 2007 when the congregation's aging members could no longer form a prayer quorum.

In 2006, Congregation Tiferes B'nai Israel in Warrington, Pennsylvania was planning to renovate its sanctuary when Adath Shalom was divesting its building. TBI repurposed Adath Shalom's ark and lecterns, acquired and displayed its memorial plaques, and Adath Shalom paid for many of the renovations at TBI. Tiferes B’nai Israel welcomed former Adath Shalom members to the rededication in November 2012.

Preah Buddah Rangsey Temple

To serve the growing Cambodian community in the neighborhood, the Cambodian Khmer Buddhist Humanitarian Association purchased Saint Andrews Lutheran Church at 6th and Ritner Streets in 2003, renovated the building, and opened the Preah Buddah Rangsey Temple in 2005. The Temple quickly reached capacity and the KBHA acquired the Adath Shalom building across the street in April 2007. The building was most recently owned by the Khmer Buddhist Humanitarian Association.

Preah Buddah Rangsey used the synagogue building for community meetings, funeral ceremonies, and as quarters for its monks. The Temple retained the synagogue's ceiling murals of the Zodiac signs with the names of the months in Hebrew, and used the second floor women's gallery for memorial cubbies to temple members. Preah Buddah Rangsey vacated the synagogue building in 2017 and listed the property and building for sale. In February 2018, they sold it to the Penh Investment Penn LLC development company.

The Temple retained many of its Jewish decorative elements. The Temple retained the two tablets of the Ten Commandments over the main entrance. The main sanctuary ceiling still had the mural of the zodiac with their names in Hebrew. The former synagogue's women's balcony stands, repurposed as a gallery for Buddhist funeral urns.

In February 2018, Penh Investment Penn LLC acquired the building for $230,000.

See also

History of the Jews in Philadelphia: Jewish Quarter of Philadelphia

References 

20th-century synagogues
Ashkenazi Jewish culture in Philadelphia
Conservative synagogues in Pennsylvania
Former synagogues in the United States
Lithuanian-American culture in Pennsylvania
Lithuanian-Jewish culture in the United States
South Philadelphia
Synagogues in Philadelphia